Is Nothing Sacred? is the second studio album by the English/American rock band The Lords of the New Church, released in September 1983 by I.R.S. Records. The album's two singles, "Live for Today" and "Dance with Me", reached #91 and #85 on the UK Single Chart, respectively.

Compared to the gothic post-punk of their eponymous debut album, Is Nothing Sacred? saw the band diversifying musically, incorporating new wave, classic rock and ska, along with synths, horns and a greater emphasis on the bass.

Critical reception 

In a contemporary review for Sounds, Ralph Traitor gave the album 4 stars out of 5 and wrote:  "This record is a sickening sell-out, a Miles Copeland sponsored nightmare, a defilement of street credibility, punk ethics and honest hard work and a rank plagiarism of James Jewel Osterburg, and I can't actually find any fault with it."

In a retrospective review, giving the album 3 stars out of 5, AllMusic's Bill Cassel wrote: "The shadow of the Rolling Stones, the classic role model for bands who embrace rock's scuzzy, dangerous, vaguely satanic side, looms large over Lords of the New Church's second album." He felt that the influence of Mick Jagger on Stiv Bators' "lippy, sneering delivery" has never been more apparent and that Brian James emulates Keith Richards' "rhythm-oriented guitar parts." Cassel commented that if it were a Rolling Stones album, "it'd be a pretty good one, well played and entertaining throughout." He concluded that, "As a follow-up to the Lords' promising debut, Is Nothing Sacred? isn't a disaster, but it is a small step backward rather than forward."

On a more negative note, Ira Robbins of Trouser Press felt that the band ran out of material after the first song: "Following the excellent "Dance with Me," the album rolls straight down the songwriting slope, stopping off only briefly to ram through the Grass Roots' venerable "Live for Today" to no audible end." He added that, as a soundtrack for a gothic punk horror film, Is Nothing Sacred? "gets the ambience right, but that's all it does."

Track listing

Personnel 
Credits adapted from the album's liner notes.

The Lords of the New Church

Stiv Bators – vocals
Brian James – guitar, backing vocals
Dave Tregunna – bass, backing vocals
Nicky Turner – drums, backing vocals

Additional musicians

Matt Irving (credited as "Matt Black") – synthesizer, keyboards
Steve "Rudi" Thompson – tenor saxophone, trumpet
Simon Lloyd – alto saxophone, trumpet
Todd Rundgren – synthesizer on "Live for Today"

Technical
The Lords of the New Church – production 
Stephen W. Tayler – engineering 
Andy Scarth – additional engineering  
Todd Rundgren – production, engineering on "Live for Today"  
Chris Anderson – additional engineering on "Live for Today" 
Graham Humphreys – sleeve
Paul Glasson – photography
Chris Garnham  – photography

References 

1983 albums
The Lords of the New Church albums
I.R.S. Records albums
Albums produced by Todd Rundgren